Revenge of the Giant Robot is the debut album of Chicosci released on 2000 under EMI Philippines. It is the only album released when Chicosci was still named Chico Science.

Track listing

Credits 
Executive producer: Chito R. Ilacad
Album cover art: Willie A. Manzon
Colors, digital graphics and album lay-out: Joseph R. Cande
Album photography: Jay Javier
Live photography: Jason Toblerea
Recording engineer: Angee Rozul on Tracks Studios
Mixing engineer: Angee Rozul, Francis Reyes and Louie Talan at Tracks Studios
Mastered by Angee Rozul at Tracks Studios
Recorded, mixed and mastered at Tracks Studios

References

External links 
 Sink or Swim music video

2000 debut albums
Chicosci albums